In Spies v Smith, an important case in the South African law of succession, the testator was mentally retarded and epileptic, and had appointed the two daughters of his step-mother as his sole heirs. When the testator's father died, he went to live with his uncle. Thereafter, the testator made a new will appointing the sons of his uncle as his heirs.

The testator's step-mother alleged that his uncle had unduly influenced him to pass this second will, but the court held that she did not discharge the requisite onus of proving such.

See also 
 South African law of succession

References 
 Spies v Smith 1957 (1) SA 539 (A).

Notes 

Law of succession in South Africa
South African case law
1957 in case law
1957 in South African law